Mynydd Allt-y-grug is a 338-metre-high hill immediately west of Ystalyfera in the county borough of Neath Port Talbot in South Wales. Its twin summits are around 400m apart. The upper part of the hill is largely covered in heather whilst conifers clothe its western slopes and gorse, bracken and bramble cover much of its rough landslipped eastern side which rises above the Swansea Valley, drainage on this side flowing to the River Tawe.

Geology 
The hill is formed from multiple layers of Pennant Sandstone with intervening mudstone layers and occasional coal seams. All are tilted to the south and southwest towards the axis of the South Wales Coalfield syncline. The lower parts of its western slopes are mantled by glacial till. Much of the eastern side of the hill is a large landslip which is intermittently active and destructive of properties in Ystalyfera and Pantyffynnon.

Scheduled Monuments
There is an ancient cairn, possibly of Bronze Age date, a few hundred metres to the south of the hill's southern summit.

Access 
The upper parts of Mynydd Allt-y-grug are designated as open access under the Countryside and Rights of Way Act 2000 as is the conifer plantation which extends across much of its lower western slopes. There are no recorded public rights of way to its summit but a public footpath skirts the hill through the forest to its west and northwest and connects to Ystalyfera via the farmstead of Penlan-fach. There are however a number of other tracks which run across its slopes.

See also
List of Scheduled Monuments in Neath Port Talbot

References

External links 
 images of Mynydd Allt-y-grug and area on Geograph website

Mountains and hills of Neath Port Talbot
Marilyns of Wales